The Free Story is the second greatest hits album by Free, and the first which was released outside of the US. It was released on 31 December 1973 by Island Records. The album reached number 2 in the UK Albums Chart and stayed in the charts for 6 weeks. On 22 July 2013, the album was awarded a silver certification by the BPI, for UK album sales of over 60,000 units.

The album covers the entire studio album collection of Free from their debut album Tons of Sobs through to their final studio album Heartbreaker and includes their biggest hit single "All Right Now".
It also has two non-Free tracks - Just For The Box, from the album Kossoff Kirke Tetsu Rabbit, and the song Lady, from Rodgers' post-Free group, Peace, which included bassist Stewart McDonald and drummer Mick Underwood. The original intention was to include the version of Travelling Man by Andy Fraser's 1971 group Toby, but (probably at the insistence of Fraser) this track was removed and replaced by Free's version. Some German copies of the album have the Toby version.

Initial copies of the album in the UK had an individual serial number on the front in the manner of The Beatles' The Beatles ("The White Album").

Track listing

References

Free (band) compilation albums
1973 greatest hits albums